
Gmina Stąporków is an urban-rural gmina (administrative district) in Końskie County, Świętokrzyskie Voivodeship, in south-central Poland.

The gmina contains part of the protected area called Suchedniów-Oblęgorek Landscape Park.

Villages
Apart from the town of Stąporków, Gmina Stąporków contains the villages and settlements of Adamek, Bień, Błaszków, Błotnica, Boków, Czarna, Czarniecka Góra, Duraczów, Furmanów, Gosań, Grzybów, Gustawów, Hucisko, Janów, Kamienna Wola, Komorów, Kozia Wola, Krasna, Lelitków, Luta, Modrzewina, Mokra, Nadziejów, Niekłań Mały, Niekłań Wielki, Odrowąż, Pardołów, Piasek, Smarków, Świerczów, Wąglów, Wielka Wieś, Włochów, Wólka Plebańska and Wólka Zychowa.

Neighbouring gminas
Gmina Stąporków is bordered by the gminas of Bliżyn, Chlewiska, Końskie, Mniów, Przysucha, Smyków and Zagnańsk.

References
Polish official population figures 2006

Staporkow
Końskie County